A centro de transferencia modal (English: Modal Transfer Center; abbreviated as CETRAM), is a type of transport hub found mainly in Mexico City. Locally known as paraderos (English: bus or rail terminal stops), these intermodal passenger transport stations allow commuters to transfer between different modes of public transit, generally between rail and bus systems. In Mexico City, their operations are supervised by Organismo Regulador de Transporte (ORT). Since 14 December 2010, the hubs became part of a decentralized organization. Out of the 40 operative CETRAMs existing in the city, 33 are found adjacent to Mexico City Metro stations.

Outside the city, they are also found in Guadalajara, Jalisco, and in the State of Mexico, where they are known as estación de tranferencia modal (English: Modal Transfer Station; abbreviated as ETRAM).

History
The hubs were created in 1969 to complement the Mexico City Metro system. They were originally operated by the system. Around 1970, as a result of the construction of intercity bus terminals and highways, bus stops and routes began to proliferate, thanks to the opening of new Metro stations. At the beginning of 1980, with the increase in the demand for transportation, the proliferation of peseros –share taxis– began to proliferate. In 1983, the General Coordination of Transportation was created. In 1993, the control of the bus stops remained in the hands of the political delegations, but the following year the control passed to the General Coordination of Transportation. In 1995, it was renamed the Secretariat of Transportation and Roads (SETRAVI) (and later was renamed the Secretariat of Mobility or SEMOVI). SETRAVI was created as a result of the economic crisis of that year. Due to the dissolution of the state-owned company Autotransportes Urbanos de Pasajeros Ruta 100 (colloquially known as ), it was decided to grant the transportation concession to private companies, thus decreeing a Transportation Law. Between 1996 and 2002, the control of the CETRAMs changes from one agency to another within SETRAVI, until it ends up being administered by the General Directorate of Transportation Regulation. By 14 December 2010, the CETRAMs were decentralized and their operations were transferred to the Organismo Regulador de Transporte (ORT).

Since its decentralization, multiple CETRAMs have been renovated, including those at Cuatro Caminos and Ciudad Azteca stations, or are under renovations, including at Indios Verdes, San Lázaro and Martín Carrera stations.

List of modal transfer centers

Gallery

Notes

References

External links 

 

Transportation in Mexico City